The Bishop of Rockhampton is the diocesan bishop of the Anglican Diocese of Rockhampton, Australia.

List of Bishops of Rockhampton
References

External links

 – official site

 
Lists of Anglican bishops and archbishops
Anglican bishops of Rockhampton